Aliabad-e Baran Duz (also Romanized as ‘Alīābād-e Bārān Dūz; also known as ‘Alīābād) is a village in Baranduz Rural District, in the Central District of Urmia County, West Azerbaijan Province, Iran. At the 2006 census, its population was 341, in 87 families.

References 

Populated places in Urmia County